Renee XIV was an unfinished 1946 Hungarian film directed by Ákos Ráthonyi and starring Franciska Gaal, Johannes Heesters and Theo Lingen. It was intended to be a German-language film made with Soviet-backing at the Hunnia Film Studio in Budapest starring Gaal, a popular pre-war star who had been able to come out of hiding after several years. After around ten days of filming, the production was abandoned. Gaal emigrated to America the following year and never made another film.

Cast
 Franciska Gaal
 György Dénes
 Theo Lingen 
 Johannes Heesters 
 Hans Moser as Minister

References

Bibliography 
 Hans-Michael Bock and Tim Bergfelder. The Concise Cinegraph: An Encyclopedia of German Cinema. Berghahn Books.

External links 
 

1946 films
1940s unfinished films
1940s German-language films
Films directed by Ákos Ráthonyi
Hungarian black-and-white films